The Mandel is a  long river in the Belgian province of West Flanders, left tributary of the Leie (Lys). Its source is located in Passendale. It flows through Roeselare and Ingelmunster, and flows into the Leie near Waregem.

Rivers of Belgium
Rivers of West Flanders